Carola Susani (born 1965) is an Italian writer. She was born in Marostica (Vicenza). She published her first novel Il libro di Teresa (Teresa’s Book) in 1995. Her most recent book Eravamo bambini abbastanza (We Were Young Enough, 2012) won the Lo Straniero Prize and the Prata Prize for Fiction. She has also written children's books.

Her work has been translated in German, Polish and English. She is on the editorial staff of Nuovi Argumenti, a major literary journal in Italy.

Works
 Il libro di Teresa (Teresa’s Book), 1995
 La terra dei dinosauri (The Land of the Dinosaurs), 1998
 Il viaggiatore (The Traveller; short story) in anthology Italville: New Italian Writing (Exile Editions, Toronto), 2005
 Maisons sans plus de porte (reportage) in Last and Lost (Noir sur Blanc, Paris), 2007 
 Pecore vive (Live Sheep; short stories), 2007 - longlisted for the Strega Prize
 Eravamo bambini abbastanza (We Were Young Enough), 2012 - winner of the Lo Straniero Prize and the Prata Prize for Fiction

References

1965 births
20th-century Italian novelists
21st-century Italian novelists
Living people